Antoine Grimaldi may refer to:

 Antonio I, Prince of Monaco (1661–1731), or Antoine de Monaco, Prince of Monaco
 Chevalier de Grimaldi (1697–1784), natural son of Antonio I, Governor General of the Principality of Monaco

See also
House of Grimaldi